Mark Scott Thompson was manager of the El Salvador national team from 1930 until 1935. He was the first person to be given the job, making him the first and, for 91 years, the only American to coach El Salvador.

References

American expatriate soccer coaches
American soccer coaches
El Salvador national football team managers
Expatriate football managers in El Salvador
American expatriate sportspeople in El Salvador
Possibly living people